Karissa Nicole and Katie Lynne Strain (born July 21, 1990) are Canadian twin actresses and models.

They are best known for their roles in Todd and the Book of Pure Evil and Carrie.

Personal life
Karissa and Katie were born on July 21, 1990. They were supposed to be born in the month of August, but they were delivered early, making them a Cancer.

In recent years, Karissa and Katie researched their horoscope and discovered that the Sanskrit word for Cancer is Karkat. Coincidentally, the first three letters of each of their name in their birth order spells out Karkat. This led to them getting a tattoo of the word written in Sanskrit and also deciding to brand their production company name "KarKat".
Karissa and Katie have Twitter and Instagram accounts under their production name.

Career
Karissa and Katie's first film role came in the form of body doubling for Mary Kate and Ashley Olsen in their feature film New York Minute. After this, Karissa and Katie gained many roles, both together and separate, in film and television. Karissa and Katie's most memorable roles were as villainous twins in both Todd and the Book of Pure Evil and Carrie.

In recent years, Karissa and Katie have booked various guest star roles on television series'. In December 2015, they were cast as Cora and Jolene in the first season of the Syfy series Wynonna Earp, which is based on the comic book of same name.

Aside from acting, the twins have also done modeling. Karissa has worked as a model for Nike, Inc., Sears, amongst other things, while Katie has modeled for Ford, though mostly worked freelance.

In September 2017, Karissa and Katie booked their first lead roles as Celeste and Leeann Hart, the protagonist and antagonist, in the feature film Downward Twin, which they began filming on October 16, 2017. Downward Twin was later renamed to Twinsanity and was digitally released on September 18, 2018.

Filmography

Karissa

Katie

References

External links
Karissa-
Katie-

21st-century Canadian actresses
1990 births
Living people
Place of birth missing (living people)
Twin actresses